Intelsat 701 (also known as IS-701 and Intelsat 7-F1) is a geostationary communication satellite that was built by Space Systems/Loral (SSL). It is located in the orbital position of 29.5 degrees east longitude and it is currently in an inclined orbit. The same is owned by Intelsat. The satellite was based on the LS-1300 platform and its estimated useful life was 15 years.

The satellite was successfully launched into space on October 22, 1993, at 06:46:00 UTC, using an Ariane 44L vehicle from the Guiana Space Center in French Guiana. It had a launch mass of 3,642 kg.

The Intelsat 701 is equipped with 26 transponders in C band and 10 in Ku band to provide broadcasting, business-to-home services, telecommunications, VSATnetworks.

External links 
 Intelsat 701 TBS satellite
 Intelsat 7 Gunter's Space Page
 Intelsat 701 SatBeams

Spacecraft launched in 1993
Intelsat satellites